The 2010 season of the Esiliiga, the second level in the Estonian football system, is the 20th season in the league's history. It starts in March and ends in November. The defending champions are Levadia II, who are unable for promotion as they are the reserve team for Meistriliiga side Levadia.

Overview

League table

Results
Each team plays every opponent four times, twice at home and twice on the road, for a total of 36 games.

First half of season

Second half of season

Top scorers

Awards

Monthly awards

See also
 2010 Meistriliiga
 2009–10 Estonian Cup

References

External links
 soccernet.ee 

Esiliiga seasons
2
Estonia
Estonia